Roger Guilard is a French chemist. He is a professor of chemistry at the University of Burgundy in Dijon, France where he is a member of the Institute of Molecular Chemistry of the University of Burgundy.

Career 

Guilard received the "Agrégation de Sciences Physiques" Degree in 1966 and a PhD in 1971 from the University of Burgundy.  He was a Postdoctoral Fellow at the University of Basel, Switzerland and at the University of Darmstadt, Germany from 1972 to 1973, and subsequently has been at the University of Burgundy from 1973 to present. At the University of Burgundy he has been the director of the Laboratory of Synthesis and Organometallic Electrosynthesis and the Molecular Engineering Laboratory for Separation and Applications of Gases.

Guilard was Scientific Director of the Department of Chemistry at the French Ministry of Education, Technology and Research, and then Managing Director for the partnership of local authorities in the Partnership Branch of the Centre National de la Recherche Scientifique, CNRS.

Guilard founded two companies, Chematech and PorphyChem  which produce tetraazamacrocycles, porphyrins, phthalocyanines and related compounds, respectively, for use in research, industrial applications and health care.  He is also a member of the advisory board of LARS - Ligament Augmentation and Reconstruction System which provides synthetic ligaments for soft tissue repair.

Guilard holds 23 patents, including a technique for decontamination of radioactive elements from wastewater, a process for removing lead from drinking water and a carbon monoxide sensor. He has published more than 475 articles in peer-reviewed journals and has co-edited several influential book series including The Porphyrin Handbook, the Handbook of Porphyrin Science,  the World Scientific Series on Chemistry, Energy and the Environment, and the World Scientific Series: From Biomaterials Towards Medical Devices. He was an associate editor for the journal Dalton Transactions and has served on the editorial boards for Dalton Transactions, the Journal of Porphyrins and Phthalocyanines and the New Journal of Chemistry.

Selected awards/honors 

 2013 - "Grand Prix - Emile Jungfleish" Grand prize from the French Academy of Sciences,
 2010 - Robert Burns Woodward Career Award in Porphyrin Chemistry, 6th International Conference on Porphyrins and Phthalocyanines (ICPP)
 2001 - "Grand Prix - Gaz de France (Applications)" Grand prize from the French Academy of Sciences
 2001 - Honoris Causa Doctorate from the University of Sherbrooke (Canada)
 1997 - "Prix - Paul Langevin" Prize from the French Academy of Sciences
 1999 - Association of American Publishers Award for Excellence in Professional/Scholarly Publishing
 1991 - "Prix - Marguerite de la Charlonie" Prize from the French Academy of Sciences
 1978 - "Prix -  Société chimique de France" Prize from the French Chemical Society (SCF), Coordination Chemistry Division

Memberships/fellowships/positions 

 2000–present - Vice President of the Society of Porphyrins and Phthalocyanines (SPP)
 1996-2018 - Editorial board of Journal of Porphyrins and Phthalocyanines (JPP)
 2015 - Fellow of the Academia Europaea
 2014 - Distinguished Member of the French Chemical Society
 2008 - Japan Society for the Promotion of Science (JSPS) fellow
 1997-2002 - Member, Editorial Board of the New Journal of Chemistry
 1996-2002 - Associate Editor and member, Editoral Board of the Journal of the Royal Chemical Society, Dalton Transactions
 2001 - Knight of the National Order of Merit, France
 1999 - Commander, Order of Academic Palms

References

External links

Living people
1940 births
Date of birth missing (living people)
20th-century French chemists
21st-century French chemists
Academic staff of the University of Burgundy
University of Burgundy alumni
French National Centre for Scientific Research scientists
French company founders
Knights of the Ordre national du Mérite
Academic journal editors
Members of Academia Europaea
Academic staff of Technische Universität Darmstadt